Mont-Saint-Pierre is a village municipality in Quebec, Canada, located in the regional county municipality of La Haute-Gaspésie in the administrative region of Gaspésie–Îles-de-la-Madeleine.

The village is located at the foot of the eponymous Mount Saint-Pierre. The place was formerly called Rivière-à-Pierre.

The 2021 census there were 186 inhabitants.

Mont-Saint-Pierre is well known for hang-gliding and paragliding, and home to the Mont-Saint-Pierre Ecological Reserve. The Festival of Free Flight (Fête de Vol Libre) is held each year since 1978.

History

Permanent settlement occurred in 1858. Its post office opened in 1904. In 1947, the village was incorporated when it separated from Mont-Louis.

Demographics 

As of 2021, the population speaks almost exclusively french. The breakdown of mother tongues currently is:
 English as first language: 0%
 French as first language: 94.6%
 English and French as first language: 0%
 Other as first language: 2.7%

See also
 List of village municipalities in Quebec

References

External links
 Tourisme Mont-Saint-Pierre

Incorporated places in Gaspésie–Îles-de-la-Madeleine
Villages in Quebec